Harold Howard is a Canadian martial artist.

Harold Howard may also refer to:

Harold Palmer Howard (1866–1951), U.S. Army general

Sir Seymour Howard, 1st Baronet (1886–1967), Harold Seymour Howard
Harold Howard (Teenwolf)

See also
Harry Howard (disambiguation)